The Ahar River is a tributary of the Berach River (itself a tributary of Banas River, which in turn is a tributary of Chambal river, itself a tributary of Yamuna River, which in turn is the most important tributary of Ganges River).

The river flows through the Udaipur city and is its larger drainage body. The spill water of the famous Lake Pichola and Fateh Sagar Lake of Udaipur district gets into the Ahar river. The river further downstream feed the Udaisagar Lake located just outside Udaipur city. This historically important river is at present functioning as the drainage body of the Udaipur city filled with sewage and garbage.

Ahar River is also the site of 3000 BC to 1500BC Chalcolithic archaeological culture Ahar-Banas culture.

On its river bank in Udaipur there are Royal Cenotaphs of Maharanas of Mewar called "Ahar ki Chhatriya" literally Ahar Cenotaphs .

References

External links 
 Pre-Historic Era of Ayad

Rivers of Rajasthan
Udaipur district
Chalcolithic sites of Asia
History of Rajasthan
Archaeological sites in Rajasthan
Rivers of India